Anthene tisamenus is a butterfly in the family Lycaenidae. It is found in Gabon.

References

Butterflies described in 1891
Anthene
Endemic fauna of Gabon
Butterflies of Africa